Oulema margineimpressa is a species of leaf beetle in the family Chrysomelidae. It is found in North America.

References

Further reading

 

Criocerinae
Articles created by Qbugbot
Beetles described in 1933